HMAS Waratah is a former Royal Australian Navy (RAN) naval administrative centre located in Washington, D.C., United States of America. The centre was operational between 1966 and as late as 1986.

See also
List of former Royal Australian Navy bases

References

Closed facilities of the Royal Australian Navy
1966 establishments in Australia
Military units and formations established in 1966
1980 disestablishments in Australia
Military units and formations disestablished in 1980